The men's tournament of water polo at the 2011 Pan American Games in Guadalajara, Mexico took place from October 23 to October 29, when the United States defeated Canada 7–3 for the gold medal. All games were held at the Scotiabank Aquatics Center. The defending champions are the United States. The winner of the competition has qualified directly for the 2012 Summer Olympics in London, Great Britain, while the second through fourth-place finishing teams have qualified for the 2012 Men's Water Polo Olympic Games Qualification Tournament that was held in Edmonton, Canada.

Qualification
A National Olympic Committee may enter one men's team for the water polo competition. Mexico, the host nation along with seven other countries qualified through regional competitions.

 At the Central American and Caribbean Games, Venezuela competed, and finished higher than Trinidad and Tobago, but this qualifying round is open to nations from CCCAN only.
 Puerto Rico withdrew and were replaced by Cuba.

Format
 Eight teams are split into 2 preliminary round groups of 4 teams each. The top 2 teams from each group qualify for the knockout stage.
 The third and fourth placed each group will crossover and play each other in the fifth to eighth place bracket.
 In the semifinals, the matchups are as follows: A1 vs. B2 and B1 vs. A2
 The winning teams from the semifinals play for the gold medal. The losing teams compete for the bronze medal.

Preliminary round
All times are local Central Daylight Time (UTC−5)

Group A

Group B

Elimination stage

Crossover

Seventh place match

Fifth place match

Finals Bracket

Semifinals

Bronze medal match

Gold medal match

Final standings

References

External links
Tournament draw and schedule 

Water polo at the 2011 Pan American Games